Nymark (Norwegian: "new ground") was the name that artist Alex Hartley gave to a small island he discovered in the arctic archipelago of Svalbard, a Norwegian territory, in 2004.  It is officially named Nyskjeret by the Name Committee for Norwegian Polar Regions (skjer = skerry). It is a small island in the Barents Sea, 500 miles off the coast of Norway. It emerged from the now melted portion of a retreating glacier and is around the size of a football field.

As part of the London 2012 Cultural Olympiad, Hartley toured a scaled version of Nyskjæret round the South West coast of England as nowhereisland. According to its website, it provided a platform to engage with issues raised by the project, exploring a sense of place through an epic, nomadic sculpture and how we can respond to the issue of global warming. The island was discovered during a Cape Farewell expedition of scientists and artists, collaborating on a cultural response to global warming and the retreating Arctic ice pack.  A large wall exhibit made from framed rock samples, letters, maps, photographs, and other documentation materials forms part of Cape Farewell - Art and Climate Change, and appeared in the National Conservation Centre in Liverpool as part of the 2006 biennial .

Nymark is also an area of the city Bergen in Norway. One of the leading soccer clubs in the country, Brann, has its stadium in Nymark, and the area also has many other sports facilities (such as soccer fields, handball and basketball stadiums).

References

Links 
 Artists taking the lead - Alex Hartley
 nowhereisland  project website
 Alex Hartley
 Britânico quer criar uma república no Ártico (Agence France-Presse, in Portuguese)
 Englishman claims sovereignty over Norwegian island (Reuters, May 12, 2006)
 Briton claims new Svalbard island (PhysOrg.com, May 10, 2006)

Islands of Svalbard
Islands of the Barents Sea
2012 Cultural Olympiad